The Kaitz index, devised in 1970 and named after Hyman Kaitz, is an economic indicator represented by the ratio of the nominal legal minimum wage to median wage adjusted for the industry-level coverage.

See also 
 Minimum wage law

References 

Employment compensation